Parapediasia is a genus of moths of the family Crambidae.

Species
Parapediasia atalanta (Bleszynski, 1963)
Parapediasia cervinellus (Zeller, 1863)
Parapediasia decorellus (Zincken, 1821)
Parapediasia detomatellus (Möschler, 1890)
Parapediasia hulstellus (Fernald, 1885)
Parapediasia ligonellus (Zeller, 1881)
Parapediasia murinellus (Zeller, 1863)
Parapediasia paranella (Bleszynski, 1963)
Parapediasia subtilellus (Zeller, 1863)
Parapediasia tenuistrigatus (Zeller, 1881)
Parapediasia teterrellus (Zincken, 1821)
Parapediasia torquatella B. Landry, 1995

References

Natural History Museum Lepidoptera genus database

Crambini
Crambidae genera
Taxa named by Stanisław Błeszyński